The Chinese Ambassador to the Central African Republic is the official representative of the People's Republic of China to the Central African Republic.

List of representatives

See also

Central African Republic–China relations

References 

 
Central African Republic
China